Narcíso Monturiol may refer to one of the following submarines of the Spanish Navy named after submarine pioneer Narcís Monturiol:

 , Spanish A-class submarine (Italian F class)
 , the former American  USS Picuda (SS-382); acquired by the Spanish Navy in 1972; laid up with mechanical defects in 1975; struck from the Spanish Navy in 1977
 , the former American Balao-class submarine USS Jallao (SS-368); acquired by the Spanish Navy in 1974; decommissioned in 1984 and scuttled off Cartagena in 1985
 ,  under construction in Cartagena

Narcíso Monturiol